Walfredo Reyes Jr. (born Walfredo de los Reyes Palau IV; December 18, 1955) is a Cuban American musician who is an expert in drum set and auxiliary percussion, and a music educator and clinician. He has performed with many jazz, Latin, World music, World fusion, Afro-Cuban, and rock bands as a touring, session recording, and full-time player/performer. Reyes is known for his fusion of many of the world's percussion techniques, including the ability to play a drum set with his hands in addition to the traditional use of drumsticks; it was said that he can "sound like a drummer and a percussionist at the same time". He was a long-term member of Santana. He was also a member of Chicago as the percussionist from 2012 to 2018, at which point he took over the drum seat. He also performs in the band of former Nazareth guitarist Manny Charlton.

Biography
Walfredo Reyes Jr. was born on December 18, 1955, in Havana, Cuba. His native name of Walfredo de los Reyes Palau IV is a traditional Cuban combination of his paternal and maternal surnames. He is a third generation musician in a prolific professional musical lineage on both sides of his family, including several globally recognized percussion experts. His father is percussionist Walfredo Reyes, Sr.; one brother is world music percussionist Daniel de los Reyes; another brother is actor Kamar de los Reyes; and his grandfather is trumpeter and Cuban orchestral organizer, Walfredo de los Reyes II.

Reyes has had a lifelong interest in the music of the band Chicago, originally known as Chicago Transit Authority. The first album he purchased as a youth was with his own money was Chicago Transit Authority'.

Walfredo Reyes Jr. and his wife Kirsten were married on March 21, 2020, and live in Greater Cincinnati.

Career
Leading up to his current role with the band Chicago, Reyes had a connection as a lifelong fan of the band, as a long-time friend of and collaborator with former drummer Tris Imboden, and as brother of Chicago's previous percussionist Daniel de los Reyes.

He is the title character of the Phish song "Walfredo".

For the 2021 movie Being the Ricardos, Reyes coached and mentored Javier Bardem in learning the conga drums performed in the film.

Reyes has globally toured and/or recorded with countless international acts, including the following:

 

Discography

Videography

Equipment
Reyes uses and endorses the following equipment:
Mapex Drums
Sabian Cymbals
Latin Percussion
Remo Drumheads
Regal Tip: Walfredo "El Rockero" Reyes Jr. signature series drumsticks.  Reyes designed his own signature series of drum sticks, earning him Regal Tip's unique nickname of "El Rockero''" (lit. "The Rocker" in English.)
Audix microphones
Protection Racket drum cases

See also

Notes

References

External links

Official Chicago website 

1955 births
Living people
American performance artists
Cuban jazz percussionists
American percussionists
21st-century American composers
American male composers
Chicago (band) members
20th-century American composers
20th-century American male musicians
21st-century American male musicians
American male jazz musicians